Khilafat o Mulukiyat is a book written by Abul Ala Maududi in October 1966 as a refutation of the book, The Caliphate of Mu'awiyah and Yazid by Pakistani scholar Mahmood Ahmad Abbasi.

Content
This book discusses about the stages of transformation of Khilafat into monarchy. It was translated into English and published under the title, Islam's Political Order: The Model, Deviations and Muslim Response. The English edition was translated by Tarik Jan.

Reviews & Criticism
Some Sunni scholars have written in an attempt to refute Maududi's book. Some prominent works are Khilafat-o-Malookiat, Tareekhi-o-Shar'i Haysiat by Hafiz Salahuddin Yousaf, Shahwahid-e-Taqaddus by Syed Muhammad Miyan Deobandi and Hazrat Muawiyah aur Tareekhi Haqa'iq by Muhammad Taqi Usmani. Works in favour of Maududi include nearly 700 pages long Tajaliat-e-Sahabah by Amir Usmani, nephew of Shabbir Ahmad Usmani; who originally wrote for almost a year in favour of Abbasi's book. Amir Usmani went so far as to claim that Maududi's book was unprecedented in the entire Islamic literature. Another book in favour, Khilafat-o-Malookiat par Aitrazat ka Tajziya was written by Justice Malik Ghulam Ali.

References

External links
Shi’ism and Sunnis: Conflict and Concord from Al-Islam.org

1966 non-fiction books
Books by Sayyid Abul Ala Maududi